Short-track speed skating is a form of competitive ice speed skating. Related sports include long track speed skating and inline speed skating.

History
Short-track skating developed from speed skating events that were held with mass starts. This form of speed skating was mainly practised in the United States and Canada, as opposed to the international form (derived from Europe), where athletes skated in pairs. At the 1932 Winter Olympics, speed skating events were conducted in the mass start form. Competitions in North America tended to be held indoors, for example in Madison Square Garden, New York, and therefore on shorter tracks than was usual for outdoor skating.

In 1967, the International Skating Union (ISU) adopted short-track speed skating, although it did not organize international competitions until 1976. World Championships in short-track speed skating have been officially held since 1981, although events held in 1976–1980 under different names have since received the status of World Championships retrospectively. The name of the competition was changed several times before it was eventually titled the "World Short Track Speed Skating Championships" in 1989; the championships are now held annually.

Short-track speed skating was introduced as a demonstration sport at the 1988 Winter Olympics in Calgary, Canada. It was upgraded to a full Olympic sport in 1992 and has been part of the Winter Olympics ever since. There were only four short-track events in the 1992 Winter Games, but the program was expanded to include six events in 1994 and 1998, and finally eight events in the 2002 Winter Games. The events are the same for both men and women: 500 meters, 1000 meters, 1500 meters, plus the relay event (5000 meters for men, 3000 meters for women). Since the 2018–19 World Cup season, a 2000-meter mixed-team relay was added, and debuted in the 2022 Winter Olympics. A 3,000-meter super-final event is included in the European Championships, but this is not currently part of the Olympic short-track program.

Rules
Skaters who commit one of the following offences risk immediate disqualification from a race and having their times rendered invalid.
Impeding: Intentionally pushing, blocking, tripping or otherwise causing an impediment for another skater
Off track: Skating outside the designated track
Assistance: Giving physical assistance to another skater. For example: pushing a teammate from behind for an extra boost, or allowing a teammate to lean on another for stability in corners
Shooting the line or Kicking out: Driving the foot in lead ahead to reach the finish faster, resulting in the lead foot lifting off the ice and creating a dangerous situation for others
Unsportsmanlike conduct: Acting in a manner not befitting an athlete or a role model. Including cursing at a competitor, kicking your feet, striking other skaters or officials, etc.
Equipment: Not wearing the proper safety equipment, losing equipment during the race, or exposure of skin not on face or neck.
False Start: Leaving before firing of the starter's pistol. On the second violation in the race, the offender on that start risks disqualification & must leave.
Did not finish: Usually due to injury, the skater did not finish the race.
Did not skate: The skater did not go to the starting line.

In relay races, each team has four skaters, who can take turns freely by tagging. A skater may be relayed at any time except during the last two laps. Usually, the outgoing skater pushes the incoming skater to help the teammate to gain speed.

World records

Men

Women

Mixed

Notable skaters
The following is the list of athletes who are Individual gold medalist at the Olympic Winter Games or Overall World Champion and have won Olympic Winter Games or Overall World Championships at least three times.

Men

Women

See also
Short-track speed skating at the Winter Olympics

References

External links 

 IOC – Short-track speed skating
 ISU – Short-track speed skating
 Speed Skating Canada
 US Speed Skating
 Italian short-track speed skating
 Australian Ice Racing

 

Winter Olympic sports
Individual sports
Ice skating
Ice skating sports